The Chevalier Sivaji Ganesan Award for Excellence in Indian Cinema is given by STAR Vijay as part of its annual Vijay Awards ceremony for excellence in Indian Cinema.

The list
Here is a list of the award winners and the films for which they won.

See also
 Tamil cinema
 Cinema of India

References

Chevalier Sivaji Ganesan Award for Excellence in Indian Cinema